Mortuary Academy is a 1988 American comedy film starring Christopher Atkins and Perry Lang. The film was released on DVD in full screen with no extras in 2005.

Plot summary
Sam (Christopher Atkins) and Max Grimm (Perry Lang) inherit the Grimm Mortuary and Academy from their uncle, but in order to obtain it, they must graduate from the mortician's course. The current owner is Dr. Paul Truscott (Paul Bartel), who tells the Grimm brothers that if they fail to graduate, the ownership of the business will stay with him. Truscott and his assistant Mary (Mary Woronov), who is the only professor at the academy, conspire to make sure the brothers do not succeed. Both Paul and Mary have necrophilia, messing with dead bodies and doing poor mortuary jobs for customers. The other students try to graduate as well, including a student that impales dead bodies and another student that brings a puppy "back from the dead" with robotic engineering.

Reception
A review in the book VideoHound's Complete Guide to Cult Flicks and Trash Pics says, "An attempt to recapture the successful black humor of the earlier Bartel/Woronov teaming Eating Raoul, this one's dead on arrival except for an uproarious title sequence". Glenn Erickson of DVD Talk wrote, "As can be guessed, Mortuary Academy is basically a one-joke idea drawn out to infinity. It lacks a satiric edge and only Bartel and Woronov are intermittently amusing." Ian Arbuckle, writing for CHUD.com, said, "Its edgy humor has been somewhat dulled by time (the film was released in ’88), but it’s still as good as most gross-out comedies these days, and at least it’s internally coherent." It was reviewed by Variety.

References

External links
 
 

American parody films
1980s English-language films
1988 films
American black comedy films
1988 comedy films
Films directed by Michael Schroeder
1980s American films
Necrophilia in film